Chereponi is one of the constituencies represented in the Parliament of Ghana. It elects one Member of Parliament (MP) by the first past the post system of election. Chereponi is located in the Chereponi district  of the North East Region of Ghana.

Boundaries
The seat is located within the Saboba/Chereponi district of the North East Region of Ghana.

Members of Parliament

Elections

Doris Asibi Asiedu died on 31 July 2009 after an illness. The Electoral Commission of Ghana organised a by-election for 29 September 2009. Samuel Abdulai Jabanyite (NDC) was declared the winner and duly elected MP by the Electoral Commission of Ghana

See also
List of Ghana Parliament constituencies

References 

Parliamentary constituencies in the North East Region (Ghana)